Francisco Antonio Toronjo Arreciado (Alosno, June 13, 1928 – Huelva, 1998), known as Paco Toronjo, was a Spanish flamenco singer.

He learned to sing local traditional folk music in his home town of Alosno. He left his province when he was 20 years old to become a professional musician. At the beginning of his musical career he sang with his brother, Pepe Toronjo, as a duet. They were known as "Hermanos Toronjo"(Toronjo Brothers), and were the first to record "Sevillanas".

After his brother's death he started to develop and record his own style of "fandango", which was very dramatic, with lyrics  based on his own life. He sang about the sorrows he had experienced and used the "Siguiriyas" style as a way of increasing the emotional intensity of his work.

This style, along with his rasping singing voice, propelled him to become one of the most respected fandango singers of his generation. In his later years, when he was living in the city of Huelva, he became well known for his bohemian lifestyle.

He appeared in two movies by the Spanish film director Carlos Saura:"Sevillanas" and "Flamenco".

He died in 1998; since then several monuments have been built to remember him in his home province  and a complete biography had been released.

References

External links 
 Article on 20minutos Spanish Newspaper (Spanish)

1928 births
1998 deaths
Flamenco singers
Spanish buskers
People from the Province of Huelva
Singers from Andalusia
20th-century Spanish singers
20th-century Spanish male singers